Høng is a town with a population of 4,355 (1 January 2022) in Region Sjælland near the west coast of the island of Zealand (Sjælland) in Denmark. It was the municipal seat of the former Høng Municipality.

Høng Municipality

The former Høng Municipality (Danish, Høng Kommune) covered an area of 145 km2, and had a total population of 8,411 (2005).  Its last mayor was Ingver Jensen.

On 1 January 2007 Høng Municipality ceased to exist as the result of Kommunalreformen ("The Municipality Reform" of 2007).  It was merged with Bjergsted, Gørlev, Hvidebæk, and Kalundborg  municipalities to form the new Kalundborg Municipality.   This created a municipality with an area of 598 km2 and a total population of 48,697 (2005).

Transport 

Høng is served by Høng railway station. It is located on the Tølløse railway line and offers local train services to Tølløse and Slagelse.

Notable people 
 Peter Madsen (born 1971) Danish engineer, entrepreneur and convicted murderer; interested in rockets and submarines. Was brought up in Høng

References

 Municipal statistics: NetBorger Kommunefakta, delivered from KMD aka Kommunedata (Municipal Data)
 Municipal mergers and neighbors: Eniro new municipalities map

External links
 Kalundborg municipality's official website 

Former municipalities of Denmark
Cities and towns in Region Zealand
Kalundborg Municipality